Carenum magnificum is a species of ground beetle in the subfamily Scaritinae, found in Australia. It was described by William John Macleay in 1887.

References

magnificum
Beetles described in 1887